Shanggao County is a county in the northwest of Jiangxi province, People's Republic of China. It is under the jurisdiction of the prefecture-level city of Yichun.

Administrative divisions
In the present, Shanggao County has 3 Subdistricts, 11 towns and 10 townships. 
3 Subdistricts
 Xuri
 Luoqiao
 Xingyuan

11 towns

10 townships

Demographics 

Climate

Notes and references

External links
  Government site - 

 
County-level divisions of Jiangxi